Paul Robert Hess (born August 29, 1948) is an American former politician who served in the Kansas state legislature from 1971 to 1984.

Hess was born in Albany, New York. He was originally elected to the Kansas House of Representatives in 1970, serving one term there. In the 1972 elections, he won election to the Kansas State Senate in the 30th district. He served for three terms in the Kansas Senate, during which he rose to chair of the Ways and Means Committee.

References

Republican Party Kansas state senators
Republican Party members of the Kansas House of Representatives
20th-century American politicians
Politicians from Wichita, Kansas
1948 births
Living people